This is the list of governors of the Special Region of Yogyakarta in Indonesia. Due to its root from the Yogyakarta Sultanate and Pakualaman Principality, the 5 September 1945 joint statement regarding their integration into Indonesia, and the great contribution of the royal realms in the Indonesia National Revolution, the former royal realms is formally granted the status of special province since 1950.

Based on Act No.13 (2012) on Specialty of the Special Region of Yogyakarta, since 2012 the government of Indonesia formally recognized the reigning Sultan of Yogyakarta as the hereditary Governor of Yogyakarta Special Region and the reigning Prince of Paku Alam as the hereditary Vice Governor of Yogyakarta Special Region (Article 18 Paragraph 1c). The terms for both offices is limited to 5 years per period (Article 25 Paragraph 1), but not bounded by term limits that is normally applied to such public office (Article 25 Paragraph 2), effectively allowing the reigning Monarch of both Royal Houses to hold their position for life and passed it to its successor.

List

The following are the governors of the province :

Notes

References

Yogyakarta